Rougier Hill is an ice-free hill just east of LaPrade Valley in the north part of the Cumulus Hills, overlooking the south side of McGregor Glacier. Named by the Texas Tech Shackleton Glacier Expedition (1964–65) for Michael Rougier, staff photographer with Life Magazine who was seriously injured while climbing this hill with the expedition.
 

Hills of the Ross Dependency
Dufek Coast